Ženski košarkaški klub Šumadija Kragujevac is a Serbian women's basketball team from Kragujevac, Serbia. The club currently plays in Women's Serbian League.

2015 roster

Notable former players
Marina Marković
Jelena Milovanović
Adrijana Knežević

Notable former coaches
Petar Marković

External links
 Profile on eurobasket.com
 Profile on srbijasport.net
 Profile on kosarka24.rs

 
Sumadija Kragujevac
Sport in Kragujevac